Quri Ch'uma (Aymara quri gold, ch'uma filtering, "gold filtering", also spelled Corichuma, Corri Chuma, Khori Chuma, Korichuma), also named Inmaculado, is a mountain in the Kimsa Cruz mountain range in the Bolivian Andes, about 5,312 metres (17,428 ft) high. It is situated in the La Paz Department, at the border of the Inquisivi Province, Quime Municipality, and the Loayza Province, Cairoma Municipality and Malla Municipality. Quri Ch'uma lies south of  Salvador Apachita and northwest of Yaypuri.

See also
 Mama Uqllu
 List of mountains in the Andes

References 

Mountains of La Paz Department (Bolivia)